Choragh-e Suz (also Romanized as Chorāgh-e Sūz; also known as Chorāk) is a village in Senderk Rural District, Senderk District, Minab County, Hormozgan Province, Iran. At the 2006 census, its population was 646, in 187 families.

References 

Populated places in Minab County